Scared! (stylized as SCARED!), formerly titled as Scared on Staten Island!, is an American paranormal public-access television cable TV series that was first shown on September 12, 2002, on Staten Island Community Television. Produced by Core Films and Thousand Hats Productions, the program follows and stars a Staten Island-based team of urban explorers who venture into abandoned and condemned buildings in search of paranormal activity. In each episode, three main members, who are collectively known as "The SCARED! Crew" and who vary throughout the series, represent three points of view or beliefs: the psychic, scientist and skeptic.

Cast's work in the paranormal field
In 2009, the cast began a weekly Internet radio show called Scared! on the Airwaves!, which served as an official companion to the documentary series. It coincided with their being represented by Night Management, whose client roster includes other names in the paranormal field, such as Brian Harnois and Patrick Burns. In October 2010, they moved to Ideal Event Management, who represent most of the TAPS members and others in the field.

The crew makes it a point to team up with local groups when doing an investigation and from time to time find themselves working with veterans in the field, such as John Zaffis and Rosemary Ellen Guiley. Their reputation for working well with others has led to them being requested to investigate places they might otherwise not have gone.

The executive producers, Brian J. Cano and Chris Mancuso, have begun appearing at paranormal conventions to promote the show and to give their lecture on urban exploration called "The Urban Explorer's Backpack". An article of the same name, written by Cano and Mancuso, in the Winter 2010 issue of Haunted Times magazine states, "There is a fine line between bravery and stupidity, so be sure to know the extent on your own limitations as well as the severity of any particular situation before you proceed."

In May 2010, they began filming a documentary on the life and work of the paranormal researcher and demonologist John Zaffis entitled, John Zaffis: The World Within. It was premiered in September 2010 at the Dragon Con convention in Atlanta, Georgia and was reviewed by TAPS Paramagazine as being, "beautifully shot and stunningly edited".

In 2011 Cano joined the cast of the SyFy series, Haunted Collector and was in every episode of its three-season run.

Cano is currently on "Paranormal Caught On Camera" which airs on the Travel Channel and will enter its third season in late 2020.

Curtain Call
With the release of their final documentary, "Haunted Snug Harbor", in 2011, the team carried on for another year before slimming down to the duo of Mancuso and Cano. Several new documentaries were planned but never completed. In 2014, the team officially disbanded.

Festivals and awards
In 2006, the episode at the Parsonage Restaurant appeared in the inaugural Staten Island Film Festival. The Eastern State Penitentiary episode appeared at the same festival in 2007.

In 2008, the Shanley Hotel episode won Best Editing at the Director's Chair Film Festival and the Philadelphia State Hospital episode won Best Editing and Best Local Film at the same festival in 2009. The Danvers Mental Institution episode was an Official Selection the same year in the Staten Island Film Festival.

In 2009, the group was recognized by the International Paranormal Acknowledgement Awards (IPAA) and given the award for Best Paranormal Music Score.

In 2010, CORE Films received an Aegis Award in the documentary category for the Grand Midway Hotel episode.

Credited cast
Current members
Chris Mancuso (2002–2014) – producer, lead investigator
Brian J. Cano (2002–2014) – producer, head of science division
Lisa Ann (2007–2012) – psychic/medium, head of psychic division
Greg Cusick (2002–2012) – investigator
Jason Porcino (2002–2012) – narrator, investigator

Former members
Joe Rice (2002–2006) – producer, psychic
Daniel Fasulo (2002-2004)-
Rigger & Communications
Erick Bonet (2002–2006) – security
Wael "Shawn" Sharaydeh (2002–2009) – investigator
Paul DiGennaro (2007–2011) – psychometric, psychic division
Brooke Haramija (2009–2011) – case manager
Karrie-Ann Versace (2010–2011) - equipment manager
Edwin Martinez (2010–2011) - demonologist

Episodes

Season 1 (2002–03)
All locations in season 1 are in Staten Island, New York.

Season 2 (2004)

Season 3 (2006)

Season 4 (2008–09)

Season 5 (2010)

See also
 Ghost hunting
 List of reportedly haunted locations
 Paranormal television

References

External links

Scared! on the Airwaves! at PodOmatic (podcast)

2002 American television series debuts
2010 American television series endings
2000s American documentary television series
2010s American documentary television series
2000s American reality television series
2010s American reality television series
Paranormal reality television series
Television shows set in New York City
Films about urban exploration
Staten Island